Victory Bank is a wholly submerged atoll structure in the Northern Chagos Archipelago at .

It rises steeply from great depths. The lagoon is up to 33 metres deep, while the depth along much of the rim is only 5.5 metres.

External links
Indian Ocean Pilot (download PDF)

Chagos Archipelago